Andrew Bazzi (born August 28, 1997), known mononymously by his surname, Bazzi, is an American singer, songwriter, and record producer. His song "Mine", released in October 2017, gained popularity in early 2018 when it became a meme through Musical.ly edits, and the use of a Snapchat lens filter featuring the song. It peaked at number 11 on the US Billboard Hot 100, and appeared on several international charts. He released his debut studio album, Cosmic, in 2018, which peaked at number 14 on the Billboard 200 chart.

Early life and education
Bazzi was born on August 28, 1997 in Canton, Michigan. His mother is American and his father is a Lebanese immigrant. He learned to speak Arabic and played the kazoo, oud, and guitar as a child. In 2012, he began posting covers of songs on his YouTube channel. He attended Plymouth-Canton Educational Park. In November 2014, he moved to the Los Angeles area to pursue a music career. He finished high school at Santa Monica High School in 2015.

Career
Bazzi created a Vine account in July 2013. By 2015, he had accrued 1.5 million followers on the site. In September of that year, he became the first artist to release a Vine "Featured Track" which was entitled, "Bring You Home". In 2016, he was featured on the Fancy Cars' track "Fun". Over the course of the next two years, Bazzi released several singles including "Alone" "Beautiful", "Got Friends", and "Sober". Bazzi has cited artists Justin Timberlake, Bryson Tiller, Duran Duran, Michael Jackson and Guns N' Roses among his influences.

In October 2017, he released the single "Mine". Within days of its release, an A&R executive at Warner Music-affiliated Artist Partner Group had signed him to a deal including his songwriter Henry Fredrickson from Minnesota. The song increased in popularity after becoming an Internet meme, through videos featuring a slideshow of different pictures of the subject of the video with the Snapchat "hearts" filter and overlaying lyrics. In January 2018, the song appeared on the Billboard Hot 100, debuting at number 56. As of April 2018, the song's peak on the list was number 11. Bazzi also released three new singles in 2018, "Why?", "Gone" and "Honest". He is currently working on a collaboration with Marshmello. On March 13, 2018, Bazzi was announced as the special guest on Camila Cabello's Never Be the Same Tour's North American leg. On April 17, 2018, Cosmic debuted at number 35 and later peaked at number 14 on the US Billboard 200 albums chart. Bazzi joined Justin Timberlake's Man of the Woods Tour as the opening act for the European leg. He received a nomination for an MTV Video Music Award for Best New Artist. Bazzi collaborated with Camila Cabello on a remix of the song "Beautiful", which was released on August 2, 2018. Bazzi performed "Beautiful" on a float in the 2018 Macy's Thanksgiving Day Parade.

Bazzi worked with K-pop entertainment company SM Entertainment to co-write songs for two of their boy bands, EXO and NCT Dream. With NCT Dream, he co-wrote "We Go Up" with their member Mark for the EP, We Go Up. With EXO, he co-wrote "The Eve" for the studio album The War, and "Ooh La La La" and "Oasis" for the studio album Don’t Mess Up My Tempo. He also co-wrote song "Give Me a Chance" with Chinese singer and Exo member Lay Zhang for his studio album Namanana.

In April 2019, Bazzi released "Caught in the Fire" and "Paradise". On August 8, 2019, he released his debut mixtape Soul Searching, which includes the song "Paradise", as well as "Focus" (featuring 21 Savage) and "I.F.L.Y.".

In 2020 Bazzi released the singles "Young & Alive", "Renee's Song", "I Got You", "I Don't Think I'm Okay", and "Crazy".

In a Billboard interview in 2018, Bazzi mentioned that he did not have any other job experiences before his music career.

On September 16, 2022, Bazzi released the long awaited album "Infinite Dreams". The album includes a total of 19 tracks. "Dlma" is a song featuring LANY and "Only Fan" features Cordae. Bazzi announced his upcoming "Infinite Dreams" tour following the release of his album. The tour will stop in sixteen cities.

Personal life 
Bazzi lives in Los Angeles. He has talked openly about his struggles with mental health and substance abuse while quarantining during the COVID-19 pandemic. In an open letter on Twitter, he stated that he "let a drug problem get out of hand, I've been drinking my boredom away." He dated Renee Herbert.

Discography

Studio albums

Mixtapes

Singles

Notes

Other charted or certified songs

Music videos

Tours
Opening act
 Camila Cabello – Never Be the Same Tour (2018)
 Justin Timberlake – Man of the Woods Tour (2018)

Headlining Tour
 The Cosmic Tour (2018)
Bazzi Live in Asia (2019) 
 Infinite Dream Tour (2022)

Awards and nominations

See also
 History of the Middle Eastern people in Metro Detroit

References

External links
 Official website
 

1997 births
American contemporary R&B singers
American male pop singers
American male singer-songwriters
American male rappers
American people of Lebanese descent
Living people
People from Dearborn, Michigan
21st-century American male singers
21st-century American singers
Singer-songwriters from Michigan